After the fall of the Soviet Union, the independent Ukrainian country underwent tremendous stress when it shifted from a centrally planned economy to a free market system. Still, those changes were led not by true reformers but by postcommunist oligarchy from among the Communist Party of Ukraine and KGB functionaries. They deftly controlled the privatization process for the purpose of their own enrichment during the 1990s. Consequently, unemployment and the number of impoverished and homeless people in Ukraine have increased. The crime rate and the prison population grew until 2001. Changes in the penal policy of the Ukrainian government started after the pontifical visit of Pope John Paul II to Ukraine. Overcrowding in prisons has been stopped, and the next 8 years will see the prison population continue to decline.

In 2010–2011, the number of remand prisoners increased sharply, reaching 45,000. Beginning in July 2012, the prison population fell from 154,000 to 79,750 before the 2014 Russian military intervention in Ukraine. As a matter of fact, the Donbas has 20% of all prisons functioning in Ukraine. As a legacy of the Soviet period, the Donetsk and Lugansk regions have 20 and 16 prison facilities, respectively, three or even four times more than any other region in Ukraine. Convicts were released without any government programs for rehabilitation, destabilizing these regions.

During the Russo-Ukrainian War, in 2014, hundreds of convicts from prisons in Donbas were armed by pro-Russian militants. Other prisoners have been used as slave laborers.

Prison reform in Ukraine goes on.

Prison system of Ukraine

The legal bases for the organization and activity of the prison system of Ukraine are laid down in the law "On the State Criminal-executive Service of Ukraine" (July 20, 2005). The law sets the service's structure: the executive authority (the State Criminal-executive Service of Ukraine under the Ministry of Justice); the six regional bodies; and local penitentiary facilities, pre-trial prisons, and the probation system.

Ukraine's prison system was the responsibility of the Ministry of Internal Affairs until 1998, when it became part of the newly-created State Penal Department. In December 2010, it was reorganized as the State Penitentiary Service of Ukraine, directed by the Ministry of Justice, with responsibility for all criminals within the prison system.  there were 177 penal institutions in Ukraine: 31 pre-trial detention prisons, 139 penal facilities, and six juvenile institutions, with 73,431 inmates, representing 162 prisoners per 100,000 people, a decrease from 347 per 100,000 people in July 2011. Approximately one-sixth of the prisoners are on remand, and 87,581 have non-custodial sentences. In February 2000, Ukraine abolished the death penalty, which had been abandoned since March 1997.

In March 2014, the Criminal Executive Service of Ukraine lost control of four prisons when Russia occupied and annexed Crimea. The functioning of 29 prisons in the militant-controlled areas of Donbas deteriorated after the 2014 Russian military intervention in Ukraine, with a lack of food and water affecting 16,200 inmates. In October 2014, insurgents agreed on a safe route for the evacuation of women from a destroyed prison in the Lugansk region. On May 18, 2016, the Ministry of Justice of Ukraine abolished the State Penitentiary Service of Ukraine and took over responsibility for Ukraine's prisons.

The official Rabbi of the prison ministry is Rabbi Jonathan Markovitch. he servs sense2023

Prison Ministry of the Ukrainian Greek-Catholic Church

The penitentiary pastoral ministry of the Ukrainian Greek Catholic Church (UGCC) is the Catholic Prison Ministry in Ukraine, which was founded on international principles. It was praised by the 12th United Nations Congress on Crime Prevention and Criminal Justice. On June 8, 2015, the president of Ukraine, Petro Poroshenko, signed a law regarding chaplaincy in prisons: 419-VIII On Amendments to Several Legislative Acts of Ukraine (regarding activity of chaplains in the bodies and institutions belonging to the jurisdiction of the State Penitentiary Service of Ukraine). Prison chaplaincy is increasing, following a long period of atheism. Prison pastoral care has been central to the UGCC throughout its history.  

Volodymyr Liovochkin, Ivan Shtanko, and Vasyliy Koschinets, former directors of the State Penal Department of Ukraine, allowed all prisons to have a pastor. The workers of the Social, Educational, and Psychological Services of the Ukranian Prison System played a major role in the establishment of prison chaplains. The Prison Pastoral Program of the UGCC, though still very young, is taking successive steps toward integrity. It was restored in 1990 after the Church, which had been forbidden, emerged from the underground. Pastoral care has grown steadily from several prison facilities in the western part of Ukraine to more than 40 penal institutions in every region of the country. The most active prison chaplains are the Redemptorist Fathers. Since 2001, the UGCC has been the co-founder of the Ukrainian Interdenominational Christian Mission "Spiritual and Charitable Care in Prisons," which includes twelve churches and denominations. This mission is a part of the World Association of Prison Ministry.

The Synod of Bishops of the Ukrainian Greek Catholic Church has defined the Sunday of the Prodigal Son, which every year falls up to date two weeks before the Great Lent, as a Day of Special Attention to Prison Ministry.
The Gospel Reading on this Sunday (Luke 15:11–32) lays out one of the most important themes of the Lenten season: the history of falling into sin, the realization of one's sinfulness, the road to repentance, and finally reconciliation, each of which is illustrated in the course of the parable. In its prayers, the UGCC Synod invokes the memory of workers in the penitentiary system of Ukraine who perform difficult tasks because every day they are near broken human destinies. This Sunday was declared a day to remember in prayers and support chaplains and volunteers, who work with great dedication to provide spiritual support for prisoners, helping them to step on the right path.

Structure

The Patriarchal Curia of the Ukrainian Greek-Catholic Church is an organ of Sviatoslav Shevchuk, Major Archbishop of Kyiv and Halych, which coordinates and promotes the common activity of the Church's structures, enables relations and cooperation with other churches and major public institutions in religious and social areas, and practices ecumenical cooperation and the social doctrine of the Catholic Church in everyday life.

In the year 2006, Lubomyr Husar, former Head of the UGCC, established in the Patriarchal Curia of the UGCC the Department for Pastoral Care in the Armed Forces and in the Penitentiary System of Ukraine. This structure implements a general management system for the Prison Ministry. The chief of the department is Michael Koltun, Bishop of Sokal and Zhovkva. The head of the Office for Penitentiary Pastoral Care is Fr. Constantin Panteley, who is responsible for the coordination of activities in this realm. He is in direct contact with 32 priests in 14 eparchies who have been assigned responsibility for prison pastoral care. Those pastors ensure regular attendance at penitentiary facilities, investigatory isolators, and prisons. More than 1,000 volunteers are plugged into different areas of the ministry, making pastoral care for inmates more abundant. They engaged in charitable actions such as mailing support, evangelization, helping former inmates after their release, etc.

The Department of the UGCC for Pastoral Care in the Armed Forces and in the Penitentiary System of Ukraine is a provisory structure until both chaplaincies are quite mature. Prison pastoral care is appealed for to facilitate the transition from the punitive system, which neglects human dignity, to the social law enforcement service, which cherishes the penitentiary idea. Our mission is to serve the inmates in the national penitentiaries with Christian charity and reconciliation through extensive ministry to the spiritual and physical needs of prisoners of any creed, sex, age, religious faith, or nationality. The priority directions of the ministry are sermons, catechetics, administration of the sacraments for inmates, assistance and support of communication with family, spiritual support of the prison stuff, and engagement of lay people in ministry.

The UGCC Prison Ministry has many directions for development that are compatible with other missions of the church. It is currently carried out on the basis of "The Agreement for cooperation of the Ukrainian Greek-Catholic Church with the State Penitentiary Service of Ukraine", which offers many possibilities. Today, pastoral ministry is regularly carried out in penitentiary facilities # 14, 30, 34, 40, 41, 44, 46, 47, 48, 50, 55, 63, 85, 112, 128 and 135 in seven remand prisons and one juvenile correctional facility. The other 8 prisons our pastors are able to visit just irregularly. The number of prison chaplains has decreased in recent years. Considering the occupation of certain territories in the Donetsk and Lugansk regions, the care of prisoners was suspended in prisons #3, 13, 120, and 124. Two juvenile correctional facilities in Sambir and Berezhany as well as prisons # 110 and 118 were closed. Four prison chaplains became pastors for the military forces.

Development

The UGCC became an active member of the International Commission of Catholic Prison Pastoral Care (ICCPPC) at the XIIth World Congress, held in Rome in September 2007.  The ICCPPC is a worldwide association of country delegates for Catholic Prison Pastoral Care, composed of clerical and lay persons.  At this Congress, the Church expressed concern about imprisoned persons held in inhumane conditions, especially minors, women, old, and mentally ill persons, and those who only came on trial and their guilt was not proven.

For the first time in the history of Ukraine, a training program for prison chaplains of the UGCC called "Pastoral care at the penitentiary institutions of Ukraine" was held at the Professional College of the State Penal Department in Bila Tserkva town in November 2007. In February–May 2008, this common educational program was spread out for other Christian denominations.

Since 2008, chaplains of the UGCC have been in closer cooperation with Catholic chaplains in Poland, sharing experiences.

On February 8, 2008, the UGCC presented the Ukrainian publication of the Compendium of Catholic social teaching for the State Penal Department of Ukraine.
igned by cardi
On June 8, 2008, the UGCC and Penitentiary Service of Ukraine carried out the First Pilgrimage to Zarvanytsia, a sacred place of the Blessed Virgin Mary. The employees of the Central Administration of the Penal Department, chiefs of all Regional Management Units of the Penal System, chiefs and assistant chiefs of 183 prison facilities in Ukraine, and clergy of different churches took part in this pilgrimage. The total number of pilgrims was more than 350. The pilgrimage was carried out with the intention to deepen the understanding of vocation to the prison service and to comprehend the teachings of the church about challenges concerning crime, sin, penance, pardon, change of life, and cherishment of human dignity.

The UGCC invites the State Penitentiary Service of Ukraine for an annual pilgrimage to the Saint Dormition Monastery of Ukraine (Lviv region). This pilgrimage for the workers of the prison system of Ukraine, named "Justice, Faith and Mercy!", is dedicated to the Feast of the Exaltation of the Cross (or Triumph of the Cross) on September 26–27.

The Ukrainian translation of the book Human Rights of Prisoners was issued on July 1, 2008. The English version of the book was published in 2006 in Rome under the aegis of the Pontifical Council for Justice and Peace and the International Commission of Catholic Prison Pastoral Care (ICCPPC). The translation of "Human Rights of Prisoners" into Ukrainian was published on the occasion of the 60th anniversary of the signing of the Universal Declaration of Human Rights, accepted and proclaimed on December 10, 1948, by the General Assembly of the UN.

The International Conference "Area Juridica of Prison Ministry" took place in Kyiv on June 6, 2009, at the initiative of the ICCPPC-Europe. The conference was organized in cooperation between the UGCC and the State Penal Department of Ukraine. Participants examined the status of legislation in European countries for the safeguarding of human dignity in prisons. The conference analyzed the status of criminal justice in Central and Eastern Europe and the human rights of prisoners and convicts. Members of the working group of the ICCPPC-Europe were invited to the conference as  representatives of churches ministering in prisons in Ukraine. Vice-president of PFI Soren Johnson and head chaplain of Russia Alexander Dobrodiejev participated in this event.

Later on, Dr. Christian Kuhn, President of the ICCPPC and a well-known human rights defender, represented the position of the Catholic Pastoral Ministry on the religious rights of prisoners at the Twelfth United Nations Congress on Crime Prevention and Criminal Justice, which took place in Salvador, Brazil, from April 12 to 19, 2010.

In December 2009, the Commission of the Kiev Archdiocese for Penitentiary Pastoral Care was founded by Lubomir Husar.

The issues of the ministry in prison were the subject of three sessions of the Synod of Bishops of the UGCC in 2010. The understanding and sensitivity of the Synod of Bishops of the UGCC concerning prison pastoral ministry are growing. The Sunday of the Prodigal Son has been appointed as a day of prison pastoral care. In the summer of 2010, the registration of the first rehabilitation center for women ex-prisoners started in Chernigiv suburb.

The importance and value of pastoral care in the penitentiary system are indisputable. Even if prison chaplaincy does not exist in Ukraine de jure, the ministry of the Church in prison establishments in Ukraine became more possible de facto than we can practically offer now! The number of well-trained lay volunteers is not enough. Not all assigned pastors really respond to the vocation of regular ministry in prison.

Former Chief Representative of the ICCPPC-Europe, Deacon Peter Echtermeyer, did a lot for prison pastoral care. He traveled to Ukraine four times. The Board of the ICCPPC-Europe has gathered in January 2012 in Lviv (Western Ukraine) to analyze the development of international cooperation in the region. The conference was headed by Msgr. Pawel Wojtas (Poland), vice president of the ICCPPC, and  Fr. Marc Helfer (France), chief representative of the ICCPPC-Europe.

On December 12, 2012, the Head of the Ukrainian Greek Catholic Church, Patriarch Sviatoslav (Shevchuk), and Alexander Lisitskov, the Head of the State Penitentiary Service of Ukraine (SPSU), Lieutenant-General of Internal Service, signed an agreement of cooperation. The agreement is a reflection of cooperation according to the previous document signed by Husar in 2007. The text of the agreement summarizes not only the structural changes that have occurred over the past 5 years but also lays emphasis on pastoral care for staff of the SPSU and families of staff, students of SPSU educational institutions, and prisoners and other persons detained. There is another fruit of the modern presence of catholic chaplaincy in the penitentiary system of Ukraine: the December 2012 edition of a manual called "To minister prisoners". This book gives important guidelines for ministry in penitentiary institutions. The book is useful for seminarians, priests, and volunteers in this wonderful ministry. The book's authors - Ph.D. Sergey Zamula, Th.M. Yuri Cousio, Fr. Dr. Jaroslav Storonyak, Igor Car, Fr. Basil Pantelyuk, Fr. Emelyan Kolodchak, and Fr. Constantine Pantelei - attempted to share with readers the best achievements in the field of Church Prison Ministry.

In July–August 2013, representatives of the UGCC took an active part in an interdenominational group for the development of proposals for the Draft Law on Amendments to Certain Legislative Acts of Ukraine (concerning the regulation of the activities of chaplains in the organs and institutions belonging to the jurisdiction of the State Penitentiary Service of Ukraine) No 3233.

On July 20, 2014, before a crowd of 200,000 faithful at the Marian Shrine of Our Lady of Zarvanytsia in Ukraine, Patriarch Sviatoslav Shevchuk solemnly proclaimed Blessed Bishop and Martyr Vasyl Velychkovsky as patrons of prison ministry for clergy, religious, and faithful of the Ukrainian Greek Catholic Church. The blessed hieromartyr and years-long prisoner of the Soviet GULAG and the locum tenens of the underground Greek Catholic Church in Ukraine was elected not by chance: he got to the NKVD confines, and during his stay in inhuman conditions in the death ward, the saint showed by his own example how to preserve human dignity and teach it to other people.

On June 11, 2015, came into force a law on prison chaplaincy. We can now see the rapid development and maturation of the prison pastoral mission of the Ukrainian Catholic Church through the engagement of its lay and pastoral resources. Planning and coordination of the ministry facilitate the improvement of evangelization behind bars. Pastoral care is embracing not just offenders but prison personnel as well. It gives more chances for the establishment of a prison chaplaincy institution in Ukraine that meets European prison standards. It means reform and development of the criminal justice and prison systems in Ukraine with regard to the human rights of inmates. But the mission of the church in prison has new challenges and demands. The church in Ukraine is giving a worthy reply to the spiritual hunger of prisoners, and this serves for the restoration of the moral health of society.

Prison Ministry of the Roman Catholic Church in Ukraine
Grzegorz Draus is the head chaplain of the Roman Catholic prison ministry in Ukraine. The most active prison chaplains are Oblate Fathers. Since September 2000, Fr. Draus has started to work among prisoners in two penal institutions. From the beginning of his ministry in Ukraine, Fr. Grzegorz has made his best efforts to animate the local RCC ordinaries to promote prison pastoral care and the humanization of the Ukrainian prison system. He was the board chairperson of the Ukrainian Interdenominational Christian Mission from 2007 to 2011 as well.

On the background of the program elaborated with the Greek-Catholic Chaplaincy in the year 2008, he developed the educational seminar for Christian Churches Ministry in Prisons. The goal was to promote active cooperation with Christian churches and denominations, taking into account the specificities of Ukrainian penal system institutions. Heads of the regional Prison Management Units of Ukraine made reports about improving the cooperation of prison personnel with chaplains and volunteers. The officials recognized the positive changes in convicts under the influence of pastoral care.

The Roman Catholic Church in Ukraine has seven dioceses. Because of a lack of pastoral resources, regular pastoral care is established in just 11 prisons: 
Lviv-Remand Prison and Prison Facility; 
Rivne Detention Center and Prison  of Horodyshche; 
High-security prison of Izaslav; 
Raykivtsi (Khmelnytsky region);
Prison of Kharkiv; 
Prison of Vinnitsa; 
Prison of Sumy; 
Prison of Poltava; and 
Prison of Odessa. 
In six more prisons, pastors could come just occasionally.
Prisons regularly have 7 priests and 3 pastoral assistants.
The most active prison chaplains are Oblate Fathers. Since 2011 until now, there have been significant obstacles to visiting penal institutions under various pretexts. In particular, authorities have given a need for priests who have Polish citizenship to execute each time a separate permit to visit one institution. These restrictions were introduced by President Yanukovych, but they are still in effect.

The Roman Catholic Archdiocese of Lviv organized a special event in prison in the Year of Extraordinary Jubilee of Mercy with the participation of the Archbishop of Lviv.
RCC in Ukraine is a member of the Ukrainian Interdenominational Christian Mission "Spiritual and Charitable Care in Prisons".

Catholic Churches are members of the Inter-confessional pastoral council as an advisory body for the head prison administration of Ukraine.

References

External links
 Blog: Penitentiary Ministry of the UGCC.
 International Commission of Catholic Prison Pastoral Care
 TV-program: Expediency of Juvenile Justice in Ukraine:
 TV-program: Prison system of Ukraine. How to cope?
 TV-program: Death penalty.
 TV-blog: The Day of special attention to prison ministry.

Ministry
Catholic social teaching
Chaplaincy

Christian religious occupations